The 2017 VCU Rams baseball team was the program's 47th  baseball season. It was their 5th season the Atlantic 10 Conference. The Rams began their season on February 17, 2017 with a 3–0 victory over Florida State.

Personnel

2017 roster

Schedule

Rankings

References 

Vcu
VCU Rams baseball seasons
VCU Rams baseball
Vcu baseball
Atlantic 10 Conference baseball champion seasons